The 1999 World Jiu-Jitsu Championship, commonly known as the 1999 Mundials or Worlds, was an international Brazilian jiu-jitsu event organised by the International Brazilian Jiu-Jitsu Federation (IBJFF) and held at the Tijuca Tênis Clube in Rio de Janeiro, Brazil on 1 April 1999.

Teams results 
Results by Academy

External links 
 World Jiu-Jitsu Championship

References 

World Jiu-Jitsu Championship